Biological stations (also known as biological field stations)  are research station specializing in biology and ecology. Their size and purpose varies, mainly regarding research, conservation and education. They are located in all biomes, including aquatic ones. Students, other scientists and the public are the aim public of these sites. Many are focused on protected ecosystems.

Many stations in the Americas are coordinated (but not owned, controlled or funded by) the Organization of Biological Field Stations.

Stations 

Albion Field Station
Cocha Cashu Biological Station
Crommelin Biological Field Station
Kalamos Island biological field station
La MICA Biological Station
Puhtu Biological Station
Robert J. Bernard Field Station
Rocky Mountain Biological Laboratory
Wayqecha Biological Station

References 

Biological stations